Lambina Station is a pastoral lease that once operated as a sheep station but now operates as a cattle station in outback South Australia.

The property shares a boundary with Granite Downs to the west and Todmorden Station to the east. The ephemeral Alberga River runs through the property.

Lambina had been established prior to 1905. In 1906 the owner, Joseph H. Harding, sold off his stock from the property that was in the grip of drought. Harding started restocking the following year and took delivery of 1,580 sheep and 10 horses early in 1908. By 1914 the property was owned by T. Williams, and it was again struck by drought in 1925. Williams died in 1925 as result of an accident at Mount Wellbourne Station. Later the same year the property was acquired by Joe Harden, and in 1927 a total of 22 truckloads of cattle were sold off the property an sent to market. By 1934 the property was owned by A. J. Robb, who had a circular fence built around the homestead to protect it from drift sand. After heavy rains in the area in 1938 the homestead and a car belong to Mr Paige, the station manager, were buried under  of mud. Mr Paige and his workers were also stranded for three days until trucks carrying supplies arrived.

Lightning strikes initiated the fire which burnt for nearly two weeks before a  backburn helped bring it under control.

In 2012 the owner, Alan Fennell, had the unimproved land value checked by an independent assessor after the government wanted to increase land rents by some 200%. The valuer general assessed it as 380,000, whereas the independent valuer arrived at 50,000.

The land occupying the extent of the Lambina pastoral lease was gazetted as a locality in April 2013 under the name 'Lambina'.

See also
List of ranches and stations

References

Stations (Australian agriculture)
Pastoral leases in South Australia
Far North (South Australia)